Alexander Merino (born 31 August 1992) is a Peruvian tennis player.

Merino has a career high ATP singles ranking of 1177 achieved on 15 May 2017. As a doubles specialist he has a career high ATP doubles ranking of 233 achieved on 11 July 2022.

Merino represents Peru in the Davis Cup. He was first nominated to the team for the 2017 Davis Cup and played in a match against Ecuadorian tennis player Gonzalo Escobar.

Future and Challenger finals

Doubles: 26 (10–16)

References

External links
 
 
 

1992 births
Living people
Peruvian male tennis players
Tennis players from Melbourne
21st-century Peruvian people